The Happy Vagabonds (German:Die lustigen Vagabunden) is a 1929 German silent film directed by Jacob Fleck and Luise Fleck and starring Georg Alexander, Lotte Lorring and Ernö Verebes.

The film's art direction was by Jacek Rotmil.

Cast
 Georg Alexander as Fürst Adolar Gilka  
 Lotte Lorring as Tütü, Revuestar  
 Ernö Verebes as August Fliederbusch, Landstreicher  
 Truus Van Aalten as Bertha, seine Weggenossin  
 Gyula Szőreghy as Lajos von Geletnecky  
 Adolphe Engers as Alois Gradwohl, Wirt  
 Hilde Maroff as Anna, seine Tochter  
 Leo Peukert as Ferdinand Niggerl, Hotelbesitzer  
 Willi Forst as Roland, Richter  
 Hermann Picha as Kampl, Gerichtsdiener 
 Karl Falkenberg

References

Bibliography
 Bock, Hans-Michael & Bergfelder, Tim. The Concise CineGraph. Encyclopedia of German Cinema. Berghahn Books, 2009.

External links

1929 films
Films of the Weimar Republic
Films directed by Jacob Fleck
Films directed by Luise Fleck
German silent feature films
German black-and-white films